Kanga Esports is an Australian esports organisation based in Melbourne and Sydney. It currently has teams competing in League of Legends, Counter-Strike: Global Offensive, Brawlhalla, and Super Smash Bros. Ultimate. It previously had teams competing in Paladins, Rainbow Six Siege, Super Smash Bros. Melee, Tekken, Street Fighter, Fortnite, Overwatch, and Valorant.

Originally founded as a professional Paladins team in 2017, Kanga Esports saw major international success in the competitive Paladins scene before branching out into other games. The organisation's founder, Hayden "Haydz" Shiels, began his esports career as a professional Paladins player in 2016 before becoming a coach in 2018.

League of Legends 
Kanga Esports acquired Legacy Esports and its LCO spot from the Adelaide Football Club on 21 November 2021. The LCO (short for League of Legends Circuit Oceania) is the top level of professional League of Legends in Oceania; Legacy Esports had been a long-time member of the LCO and its predecessor, the OPL (Oceanic Pro League). Legacy Esports qualified for the prestigious League of Legends World Championship in 2020, placing 17th to 18th out of 24 teams.

Current roster

Paladins 
Professional Paladins player Hayden "Haydz" Shiels founded Kanga Esports in 2017. The team made several top finishes throughout its history and qualified for the Paladins World Championship in 2018, 2019, and 2020. Kanga Esports was a member of the Paladins Premier League.

Notable achievements

Fighting games 

Kanga Esports sponsors Super Smash Bros. Ultimate player Jdizzle, who  is ranked as Oceania's number one player.

Kanga Esports has also sponsored several of Oceania's top Brawlhalla players. Kylar Alice, who  is ranked as Oceania's number one player for both 1v1's and 2v2's, was previously sponsored by Kanga Esports. Kylar Alice's previous duo partner, Rite, and a current contender for number one, Doggo, are currently sponsored by Kanga Esports.

Organisation 
Kanga Esports previously had a training facility and gaming house in Atlanta, Georgia, United States.

References

External links 
 

2017 establishments in Australia
Esports teams established in 2017
Esports teams based in Australia
Counter-Strike teams
League of Legends Circuit Oceania teams
Valorant teams
Fighting game player sponsors
Super Smash Bros. player sponsors
Defunct and inactive Overwatch teams
Defunct and inactive Tom Clancy's Rainbow Six Siege teams
Defunct and inactive Smite (video game) teams